Dmytro Pyshkov (Ukrainian: Дмитро Пишков; born August 8, 1986 in Luhansk) is an amateur Ukrainian Greco-Roman wrestler.

Pyshkov won a bronze medal in the 2010 European Wrestling Championships.

References

External links

 

1986 births
Living people
Ukrainian male sport wrestlers
European Games bronze medalists for Ukraine
European Games medalists in wrestling
Wrestlers at the 2015 European Games
People from Stakhanov, Ukraine
Universiade medalists in wrestling
Universiade bronze medalists for Ukraine
European Wrestling Championships medalists
Medalists at the 2013 Summer Universiade
Sportspeople from Luhansk Oblast